Plaxiphora aurata is a species of chiton in the family Mopaliidae.

References

Mopaliidae
Molluscs described in 1880
Taxa named by Henri Filhol